Trichostema is a genus of flowering plants in the family Lamiaceae, which are aromatic herbs or subshrubs. These plants are native to North America. Many plant of this genus which have whorls of small blue flowers are called by the common name bluecurls.

Species
Species include:
Trichostema arizonicum  A.Gray – Arizona, New Mexico, Texas, Sonora, Chihuahua
Trichostema austromontanum H.F.Lewis – Nevada, California, Baja California
Trichostema brachiatum L. - central and eastern North America
Trichostema dichotomum L. – Bahamas, Quebec, Ontario, eastern and south-central United States
Trichostema lanatum Benth. – California, Baja California
Trichostema lanceolatum Benth. – Washington, Oregon, California, Baja California
Trichostema laxum A.Gray – Oregon, California
Trichostema mexicanum Epling – northeastern Mexico
Trichostema micranthum A.Gray – Arizona, California, Baja California
Trichostema nesophilum  – North Carolina, South Carolina
Trichostema oblongum Benth. – British Columbia, Washington, Oregon, California, Nevada, Idaho
Trichostema ovatum  Curran – California
Trichostema parishii Vasey – California, Baja California
Trichostema purpusii Brandegee – central and southern Mexico
Trichostema rubisepalum Elmer – central California
Trichostema ruygtii H.Lewis – northern California (Lake, Napa, Solano Counties)
Trichostema setaceum Houtt. – eastern and south-central United States
Trichostema simulatum  Jeps. – Oregon, California
Trichostema suffrutescens Kearney – Florida

References

 
Lamiaceae genera
Flora of North America